Magalotti is the name of an old Italian noble family originally from Florence, whose members often played important ecclesiastical role in the history of Vatican and Roman Catholic Church.

Notable members
Annibale Magalotti (died 1551), Italian Roman Catholic bishop
Gregorio Magalotti (died 1537), Italian Roman Catholic bishop
Lorenzo Magalotti (1637–1712), Italian philosopher, author, diplomat and poet
Lorenzo Magalotti (cardinal) (1584–1637), Italian Roman Catholic cardinal

Italian-language surnames